The Chautauqua Auditorium is a performance hall located in Getzendaner Memorial Park, in Waxahachie, Texas. It was built in 1902 and listed on the National Register of Historic Places on May 3, 1974. The hall seats 2500 and is noted for being an octagonal building. The auditorium hosts performances of the Fort Worth Symphony Orchestra as well as many country music and other shows.

History
The Chautauqua Auditorium was built by the Waxahachie Chautauqua Park Association in 1902 to hold crowds for the annual Chautauqua gatherings that had been meeting in Waxahachie since 1899.  Well known speakers and performers, including William Jennings Bryan and Will Rogers, performed in the auditorium.

The hall was renovated in 1974.  In 1977 it hosted the Open Road Music Festival.

See also

List of octagonal buildings and structures in the United States
National Register of Historic Places listings in Ellis County, Texas
Recorded Texas Historic Landmarks in Ellis County

References

External links

Waxahachie Cahutauqua Preservation Society

Waxahachie, Texas
Buildings and structures in Ellis County, Texas
Music venues in Texas
Tourist attractions in Ellis County, Texas
Chautauqua
Octagonal buildings in the United States
Event venues on the National Register of Historic Places in Texas
Recorded Texas Historic Landmarks